Bossa Nova is a 2000 Brazilian-American romantic comedy film directed by Bruno Barreto. It deals with several interwoven stories about people finding and losing love in Rio de Janeiro. It stars Amy Irving (Barreto's wife and star of his earlier films A Show of Force, Carried Away, and One Tough Cop) as an English language teacher named Mary Ann.

Cast
Amy Irving as Mary Ann Simpson
Antônio Fagundes as Pedro Paulo
Alexandre Borges as Acácio
Débora Bloch as Tânia
Drica Moraes as Nadine
Giovanna Antonelli as Sharon
Rogério Cardoso as Vermont
Pedro Cardoso as Roberto
Stephen Tobolowsky as Trevor

References

External links 
 
 
 
 Official Sony Pictures site
 Bossa Nova at Cinemateca Brasileira

2000 films
Brazilian romantic comedy-drama films
2000 romantic comedy-drama films
Films directed by Bruno Barreto
Films set in Rio de Janeiro (city)
Films set in Brazil